Sandiarto Liauw (born 26 November 1973) is a retired badminton player from Indonesia who specialized in doubles events. Started his career in  Rejomulyo club in Semarang, Liauw was a champion at the 1996 World Cup in the mixed doubles event partnered with Minarti Timur.

Throughout his career, Liauw clinched the mixed doubles titles at the 1996 Brunei and 1997 Chinese Taipei Opens. He also collected three bronze medals at the Asian Championships in 1994, 1995 and 1997.

After retired from the international tournament, Liauw started a new career as a coach, and had been the Indonesia national women's singles coach until the end of 2006. He then moved to Canada and works as a coach in ClearOne Badminton in Richmond, British Columbia.

Achievements

World Cup 
Mixed doubles

Asian Championships 
Mixed doubles

Asian Cup 
Mixed doubles

IBF World Grand Prix 
The World Badminton Grand Prix sanctioned by International Badminton Federation (IBF) since 1983.

Mixed doubles

 IBF Grand Prix tournament
 IBF Grand Prix Finals tournament

References

External links 
 

1973 births
Living people
Indonesian male badminton players
Canadian male badminton players
People from Richmond, British Columbia
Badminton coaches